PSAD Kodam VI/MLW Balikpapan or PSAD is an Indonesian football club based in Balikpapan, East Kalimantan. They currently compete in the Liga 3.

Honour
 Liga 3
 Fourth-place: 2017

References

Football clubs in Indonesia
Football clubs in East Kalimantan
Military association football clubs in Indonesia